The Ronesans Education Foundation was established in 2009 by the Rönesans Holding Honorary President Bekir Ilıcak. The Foundation keeps on maintaining its activities through the donations of Ilıcak family. The Rönesans Education Foundation Board of Directors President is Refia Jale Ilıcak. The Foundation is providing non-refundable grant scholarship for undergraduate and postgraduate students and implementing various projects at homeland and abroad, in fields of health, culture, science and sports, education being at first place. This foundation gives  many students scholarships every year in ted ronesans anatolian school.

References

External links 
 Official website

Organizations based in Istanbul
Educational foundations
2009 establishments in Turkey
Organizations established in 2009